The Benji Hillman Foundation (BHF) was founded in August 2006, in memory of Major Benji Hillman, who was killed in action during the 2006 Lebanon War. The Foundation's aims are to help lone combat soldiers and soldiers from deprived backgrounds in the Israel Defense Forces, both during and after their army service.

The foundation is named after the late Major Benji Hillman (1979–2006), a company commander in the elite Egoz Reconnaissance Unit, who was killed in Maroun al-Ras on 20 July leading his troops into battle. Hillman was regarded as having an unstinting sense of responsibility toward the soldiers under his command, particularly to lone soldiers.

Benji was born on 3 October 1979 in North West London to Judith and Danny Hillman. He had an older sister, Abigail and younger brother Shimon. His family emigrated to Israel in 1983 to Ra'anana. He attended the local primary school and then went to the Mechina in Kfar Saba and subsequently to the Midrashiya in Pardes Hanna. He also spent a year at Bnei David, the pre-military Yeshiva in Eli.

In 1998, he entered the army and was accepted to the Egoz Reconnaissance Unit. He was named outstanding soldier in basic training and in combat courses following. In 2000, he graduated from the officers' course with distinction and held positions in both Egoz and in the Golani Brigade's 51st Battalion. In June 2006, less than a month before he was killed, he married his long-time girlfriend Ayala Borger.

Projects
The Foundation, managed by Benji's first cousin Saul Rurka, is implementing a number of projects to make the lives of lone soldiers more comfortable, and to help them integrate into Israeli society.

"Lone soldiers" are young men and women, usually recent immigrants to Israel who are undertaking their mandatory service in the Israeli army. Lone soldiers often have no family in Israel, may barely speak the Hebrew language and in most cases have no place of their own to go when on leave from their army service.

The Foundation's flagship project, HaBayit Shel Benji (Benji's Home), was opened in February 2013 in Raanana to provide general assistance, their own room, good food, a surrogate family (from members of local community - Raanana) and all the comforts of home for 50 lone combat soldiers (male and female). In 2016 a fourth floor with 25 additional rooms was added to the Home. The Foundation then added a further 12 bedrooms to the home, and by Spring 2019 HaBayit shel Benji became a home to 87 lone combat soldiers.  

An additional Bayit will be built in 2022-2024 adjacent to the first, housing an additional 93 soldiers. The land has been acquired and the majority of the funding has been pledged. The foundation is seeking to raise the final amount before breaking ground. 

The second project, opened in 2014 is a Guidance Center for soldiers leaving the army and beginning their lives in Israel. This assistance is offered to both lone soldiers who are residents of the home and to all lone soldiers in general. Each former soldier is given a guidance program based on their specific needs. In 2019 the center helped over 400 former soldiers.

The Benji Hillman Foundation has a section 46 tax deductible status in Israel as well as tax deductible status in the UK, Canada and US through conduits.

References

External links
 Tribute to Benji's life.

Foundation details from charitable foundations database
The Raanana Municipality partners with The Benji Hillman Foundation for the annual walk
 See "July 20, 2006" for description and image of Benji Hillman.

2006 establishments in Israel
Israel Defense Forces
Jewish charities based in Israel
Social welfare charities